LIM and SH3 domain protein 1 is a protein that in humans is encoded by the LASP1 gene.

This gene encodes a member of a LIM protein subfamily which is characterized by a LIM motif and a domain of Src homology region 3.  This protein functions as an actin-binding protein and possibly in cytoskeletal organization.

Interactions
LASP1 has been shown to interact with Zyxin.

References

Further reading